Outer Delhi was a Lok Sabha (parliamentary) constituency in the Indian national capital territory of Delhi. It was one of the largest constituencies in India. It was abolished in 2008.

Assembly segments
From 1966 to 1993, Outer Delhi Lok Sabha constituency comprised the following Delhi Metropolitan Council segments:

 Shakur Basti
 Rampura
 Bawana
 Najafgarh
 Madipur
 Palam
 Mehrauli
 Tughlaqabad

From 1993 to 2008, it comprised the following Delhi Vidhan Sabha segments:

 Madipur
 Tri Nagar
 Shakurbasti
 Shalimar Bagh
Badli
 Sahibabad Daulatpur
Bawana
 Sultanpur Majra
 Mangolpuri
 Vishnu Garden
 Hastsal
Najafgarh
 Nasirpur
Palam
Mahipalpur
Mehrauli
Saket
 Dr. Ambedkar Nagar
 Tughlakabad
Badarpur
 Malviya Nagar (Polling stations 61–70)
 Janak Puri (Polling stations 92–124)
 Narela (Polling stations 65–69)
 Bhalswa Jahangirpur (Polling stations 1 and 2)

Members of Parliament

Election results

14th Lok Sabha: 2004 General Elections

13th Lok Sabha: 1999 General Elections

See also
 List of former constituencies of the Lok Sabha
 North West Delhi (Lok Sabha constituency)

References

Former Lok Sabha constituencies of Delhi
Former constituencies of the Lok Sabha
2008 disestablishments in India
Constituencies disestablished in 2008